The Hamm Building is a 1920 limestone, terra cotta, and brick commercial building in Saint Paul, Minnesota; its ornamentation is exceptional.  Engineers and Architects - Toltz, King and Day, Inc.  It is listed on the National Register of Historic Places. Being in the heart of Saint Paul's theatre district, the Capitol Theatre was built into the Hamm building in 1920. It was the largest, most costly, and most elaborate movie palace in the Upper Midwest.

References

Commercial buildings completed in 1915
National Register of Historic Places in Saint Paul, Minnesota
Commercial buildings on the National Register of Historic Places in Minnesota